Microdaphne trichodes is a species of sea snail, a marine gastropod mollusk in the family Raphitomidae.

Description
The length of the shell attains 3.4 mm.

The shell is yellowish white, the earlier whorls darker.

Distribution
This species has a wide distribution in the Pacific Ocean; also off Queensland, Australia.

References

 De Folin, A.G.L. 1867. Les meleagrinicoles. Especes nouvelles. Publications de la Société Havraise d'Études. Diverses 33: 41-112, 6 pls 
 Bouge, L.J. & Dautzenberg, P.L. 1914. Les Pleurotomides de la Nouvelle-Caledonie et de ses dependances. Journal de Conchyliologie 61: 123–214
 Hedley, C. 1922. A revision of the Australian Turridae. Records of the Australian Museum 13(6): 213–359, pls 42–56
 Kay, E.A. 1979. Hawaiian marine shells. Reef and shore fauna of Hawaii. Section 4 : Mollusca. Honolulu, Hawaii : Bishop Museum Press Bernice P. Bishop Museum Special Publication Vol. 64(4) 653 pp.
  Liu J.Y. [Ruiyu] (ed.). (2008). Checklist of marine biota of China seas. China Science Press. 1267 pp.

External links
 
 Dall (1919) Descriptions of new species of Mollusca from the North Pacific Ocean; Proceedings of the U.S. National Museum, vol. 56 (1920) 
 Moretzsohn, Fabio, and E. Alison Kay. "HAWAIIAN MARINE MOLLUSCS." (1995)

trichodes
Gastropods described in 1919